Thingoe South Division is an electoral division in Suffolk which returns one county councillor to Suffolk County Council. It is made up of the villages surrounding the Southern half of Bury St Edmunds and consists of the West Suffolk council wards of Barrow, Horringer, and Rougham along with parts of Moreton Hall, Whepstead & Wickhambrook, and Chedburgh & Chevington.

Parishes
The division is made up of 18 civil parishes.

Barrow   
Bradfield Combust with Stanningfield 
Bradfield St Clare 
Bradfield St George 
Chedburgh 
Chevington 
Denham 
Great Whelnetham 
Hawstead 
Horringer 
Ickworth 
Little Whelnetham 
Nowton 
Rede 
Rushbrooke with Rougham 
The Saxhams 
Westley
Whepstead

Elections
The division has been held by Conservative party since its formation at the 1985 United Kingdom local elections.

References

Electoral Divisions of Suffolk